Illinois Route 161 (abbreviated IL 161) is an east–west highway with its western terminus at St. Clair Avenue in Fairview Heights and its official eastern terminus at Illinois Route 37 near Kell.

The road continues, as various county routes, eastbound beyond Illinois 37 to Allendale at Illinois Route 1. To locals, this part of the highway is known as "The Extension", referring to the fact that road "Extends" on after its official end.

Route description 
Illinois 161 runs along portions of what once was U.S. Route 50 west of Scott Air Force Base. East of Belleville, it becomes a rural, two-lane surface road. Inside the Centralia city limits, Illinois 161 is coupled into eastbound Noleman Street and westbound McCord Street at Schwartz Road.

History 
SBI Route 161 originally ran from Belleville to Carlyle; in 1941 it was rerouted from Carlyle to IL 37 at its current eastern end, replacing IL 182. In 1964 it was extended west to Fairview Heights.

Major intersections

References 

161
U.S. Route 50
Transportation in St. Clair County, Illinois
Transportation in Clinton County, Illinois
Transportation in Marion County, Illinois
Centralia, Illinois